The 1990–91 Towson State Tigers men's basketball team represented Towson State University as a member of the East Coast Conference during the 1990–91 NCAA Division I men's basketball season. The team was led by eighth-year head coach Terry Truax and played their home games at the Towson Center.  They finished the season 19–11, 10–2 in ECC play to win the regular season conference title. The Tigers won the ECC tournament to earn an automatic bid to the NCAA tournament as No. 16 seed in the Midwest region. Towson State was defeated in the first round by No. 1 seed Ohio State, 91–74.

Roster

Schedule and results

|-
!colspan=9 style=| Regular season

|-
!colspan=9 style=| ECC Tournament

|-
!colspan=9 style=| NCAA Tournament

Awards and honors
Devin Boyd – ECC Player of the Year; First-team All-ECC

References

Towson Tigers men's basketball seasons
Towson State
Towson State